The 2015 Moçambola is the 38th season of top-tier football in Mozambique. The season began on 14 March 2014. Ferroviário Maputo won the league title by a single point with a 1–1 draw at Ferroviário Nampula. Costa do Sol could have taken the championship with a win or pulled even with a draw, but fell 1–0 at Chibuto to finish second despite leading the league for seven of the last 10 weeks. The championship was the 10th overall for Ferroviário Maputo and first since 2009.

1º de Maio, Desportivo de Nacala and Ferroviário Quelimane finished as the bottom three teams in the league table and were relegated to regional groups for the 2016 season.

Teams
A total of 14 teams will contest the league, including 11 sides from the 2014 season and three promoted from 2014 regional groups, Ferroviário Nacala, 1º de Maio and Vilankulo.

On the other hand, Têxtil do Punguè, Ferroviário Pemba and Estrela Vermelha Beira were the last three teams of the 2014 season and are playing in regional groups for the 2015 season. LD Maputo are the defending champions from the 2014 season.

Stadiums and locations

League table

Results
All teams play in a double round robin system (home and away).

Positions by round

References

Moçambola
Mozambique
Mozambique
football